Akers mekaniske Verksted (often abbreviated Akers mek. Verksted or Akers Mek.) was a workshop, later a shipyard which was established in Fossveien by the Aker River in Oslo in 1841. In 1854 the company moved to Holmen on the west side of Pipervika, which is now known as Aker Brygge. Akers mekaniske Verksted closed in 1982. During its heyday, it was the largest shipyard in Norway. One of the companies split off from the shipyard company merged with Norcem in 1987 to form Aker Norcem, which eventually became Aker ASA.

References

Shipbuilding companies of Norway
Shipyards of Norway
Defunct companies of Norway
Defunct manufacturing companies of Norway
Aker ASA
Manufacturing companies based in Oslo
Manufacturing companies established in 1841
Manufacturing companies disestablished in 1982
1841 establishments in Norway
1982 disestablishments in Norway